The Asticou Inn is an inn in Northeast Harbor, Maine. It was built in 1883. In 1899, it was destroyed by fire and rebuilt over the course of two years.

The rear of the building overlooks the Northeast Harbor inlet, which opens out to the Atlantic Ocean.

The inn has been owned by the Asti-Kim Corporation since 1965 and, between 2015 and 2019, was managed by the Acadia Corporation.

There are 48 guest rooms: 31 in the main inn, plus 17 in six adjacent buildings: Cranberry Lodge, Blue Spruce, Bird Bank, and three "Topsiders".

The inn closes for the seven months between Columbus Day (late October) and Memorial Day (late May).

History
Around 1820, John Savage II (1801–1868), son of John and Sarah Savage, 1798 settlers in Northeast Harbor, built a farmhouse on the site now occupied by the inn. Known as the Old House, he lived there with his wife, Bath, Maine, native Climena (1801–1884). After being moved a short distance to accommodate the building of the inn, the farmhouse was later moved to Asticou Way, across Peabody Drive, where it stood until it was torn down in February 2013 after standing intact for almost 200 years.

John Savage had seven children, but the only one to survive into maturity was son Augustus Chase ("A.C.") Savage (1832–1911). (One of his others sons, Samuel Tyler, was killed in 1865 at the age of 23 shortly after returning home from the Civil War, while the other sons died of tuberculosis and other diseases. Each of the daughters died young.) Augustus lived with his wife, Emily Manchester (1834–1914), in the 1854-built Harbor Cottage (now Cranberry Lodge), which sits near the apex of the corner of Peabody Drive (almost directly across from both Blue Spruce and Bird Bank, which are the other two "Asticou Cottages" that are part of the inn). A.C. and Emily Savage had eight children.

Savage correctly predicted that an overflow of vacationers to Bar Harbor would greatly benefit Northeast Harbor. In 1883, across the road from Harbor Cottage, he built the Asticou Inn. (The name Asticou comes from a Penobscot Indian word believed to mean boiling kettle.)

The original building was destroyed by a fire 16 years after opening. It was rebuilt by A.C. and his son, George (1873–1922). Another of A.C.'s sons, Frederick Lincoln Savage (1861–1924), was the architect. It reopened in 1901. The inn was spared during the great fires of 1947.

The combined Savage families took active parts in the day-to-day management of the business, with the women establishing the inn's reputation for hearty New England food and the children picking berries that contributed to desserts and pies.

George Savage died in 1922, aged about 48. His 19-year-old son, Charles Kenneth Savage (1903–1979), was brought back from his boarding school in Boston, Massachusetts, to help his mother, Mabelle (1877–1965), maintain the inn's tradition.

When Charles married, his wife, Katharine Larcher Savage (1905–2001), became the manager of the inn's kitchen, and her pastries, breads, ice creams and desserts proved very popular. Charles and Katharine ran the inn until 1964. They had a daughter and a son.

In 1956, Savage created the Asticou Azalea Garden across the street from the inn.

Some members of the Savage family were initially interred in a family cemetery around where the cottages Blue Spruce and Bird Bank stand today. They were moved to Forest Hill Cemetery, on the other side of the azalea garden, which was created by A.C. Savage in 1904. Frederick Savage, meanwhile, is buried in Ledgelawn Cemetery on Cromwell Harbor Road, along with his wife of 23 years, Alice (1879–1961), who survived him by 37 years.

In 1965, when Mabelle Savage died, ownership of the inn passed from the Savage family to the Asti-Kim Corporation, a group of local businesspeople and summer residents.

Later personnel

Richard M. Savage, a seventh-generation family member of the inn's founders (his grandfather was John C. Savage, one of A.C. Savage's eight children), was its general manager up until the early 21st century. Savage's son, Tom, died unexpectedly in 2020 at the age of 46."Thomas Richard Savage" – Bangor Daily News, October 14, 2020

Guy Toole (1938–1998) was an employee at the inn for 44 consecutive seasons (1954 to 1998). He was hired as a teenaged potwasher by Katharine Savage, eventually progressing to become the inn's concierge.

Marilyn "Muffy" Cyr (1950–2015) worked at the inn for 41 years (1972 to 2013) in various capacities, including chambermaid, head housekeeper, desk clerk, reservations manager, special functions assistant, and floral arranger. For the latter part of her time at the inn, Tom Weverstad was the special functions director.

Gallery

References

External links

Northeast Harbor, Maine
Buildings and structures in Mount Desert, Maine
Hotels in Maine
Hotels established in 1883